Fang Bian is a Chinese Sanda kickboxer. He was born on September 1, 1983 in Huaiyuan, Anhui, China and graduated from Jilin Institute of Physical Education. As of 1 October 2017, he is ranked the #8 middleweight in the world by CombatPress.com.

Career 

On May 24, 2014 in Xinyang Stadium on Yokkao 9: China vs. Muay Thai Fang Bian beat Carl N'Diaye.
January 31, 2015 in Wu Lin Feng Fang Bian beat Simon Marcus by TKO .

January 23, 2016 in Wu Lin Feng, Fang Bian beat Cedric Doumbe by decision.

June 26, 2016 in WKM world tournament, Fang Bian beat Ashkan Tahmasebi the Iranian world Kickboxing Champion by decision.

Topking World Series returned to China on November 27, 2016 with their eleventh event where Fang Bian beat Akhmet Alimbekov.

Championships and awards 

 Kickboxing
 2014 WKF World champion -80 kg
 2014 WLF Men's intercontinental champion -80 kg
 2014 IWSD World Champion -80 kg 
 Sanda
 2009 11th Chinese National Games Sanda Preliminary contest  -77.5 kg
 2008 Chinese Sanda Championship  -80 kg
 2007 Chinese Sanda Championship  -80 kg
 2006 Chinese Sanda Championship  -80 kg
 2005 Chinese Sanda Championship  -80 kg
 2004 Chinese Sanda Championship  -80 kg

Awards
Combat Press
 2015 Upset of the Year (vs. Simon Marcus)

Kickboxing Record

|-
|- style="background:;"
|-  bgcolor="#CCFFCC"
| 2020-07-18 || Win || align="left" | Yu Jianhong || Zhenhua Hero || China || Decision || 3 || 3:00
|-
|- style="background:;"
|-  bgcolor="#CCFFCC"
| 2019-09-29 || Win || align="left" | Natã Willian Gomes || David Group event || Macau, China || Decision || 3 || 3:00
|-
|- style="background:;"
|-  bgcolor="#CCFFCC"
| 2017-01-14 || Win || align="left" | Berat Aliu ||Wu Lin Feng World Championship 2017  || Zhengzhou, China || Decision (Unanimous) || 3 || 3:00
|-
|-  bgcolor="#CCFFCC"
| 2016-12-17 || Win || align="left" | Hamid Reza || 2016 Faith Fighting World Championships || Zhanjiang, China ||  Decision (Unanimous) || 3 || 3:00
|- 
|-  bgcolor="#CCFFCC"
| 2016-11-27 || Win || align="left" | Akhmet Alimbekov || Topking World Series 2016: TK 11 || Nanchang, China ||  KO (Punches)  || 2 || 2:00
|- 
|-  bgcolor="#CCFFCC"
| 2016-09-10 || Win || align="left" | Vadalma Weber || Wu Lin Feng 2016: World Kickboxing Championship in Shenzhen || Shenzhen, China || Decision (Unanimous) || 3 || 3:00
|- 
|-  bgcolor="#CCFFCC"
| 2016-06-24 || Win || align="left" | Ashkan Tahmasebi || WKM 2016 World Tournament || Chongqing, China || Decision (Unanimous) || 3 || 3:00
|- 
|-  bgcolor="#CCFFCC"
| 2016-01-23 || Win || align="left" | Cedric Doumbe || Wu Lin Feng 2016: World Kickboxing Championship in Shangha || Shanghai, China || Ext. R Decision (Split) || 4 || 3:00
|- 
|-  bgcolor="#CCFFCC"
| 2015-12-12 || Win || align="left" | Isakov Nadir || Wu Lin Feng 2015 || Beijing, China || Decision (Unanimous) || 3 || 3:00
|- 
|-  bgcolor="#CCFFCC"
| 2015-11-07 || Win || align="left" | Ricardo || 2015 Silk Road Hero Championship || Taiyuan, China || Decision (Unanimous) || 3 || 3:00
|- 
|-  bgcolor="#CCFFCC"
| 2015-10-17|| Win ||align=left| Cheick Sidibé || Wu Lin Feng World Championship 2015 || Zhengzhou, China || Decision (Unanimous) || 3 || 3:00
|-
|-  bgcolor="#CCFFCC"
| 2015-10-02 || Win || align="left" | DWEISDF || 2015 Nanxi international Championship || Sichuan, China || KO (Punches) || 1 || 0:35
|- 
|-  bgcolor="#CCFFCC"
| 2015-09-05 || Win || align="left" | Aliaksandr Sviryd || Wu Lin Feng 2015 || Guangzhou, China ||  Decision (Unanimous) || 3 || 3:00
|- 
|-  bgcolor="#CCFFCC"
| 2015-08-08 || Win || align="left" | Abel || 2015 Zhenhua Hero Tournament|| Chongqing, China || TKO (referee stoppage) || 1 ||
|- 
|-  bgcolor="#CCFFCC"
| 2015-07-18 || Win || align="left" | Bellah || 2015 Battle Dongting Lake International Tournament || Xiangyin, Hunan, China || Decision (Unanimous) || 3 || 3:00
|- 
|-  bgcolor="#CCFFCC"
| 2015-06-21 || Win || align="left" | Sonchai Me.mai || Wu Lin Feng 2015 || Chengdu, Sichuan, China || Decision (Unanimous) || 3 || 3:00
|- 
|-  bgcolor="#CCFFCC"
| 2015-05-02 || Win || align="left" | Kim Han Eol || Wu Lin Feng 2015 || Xingyang, Henan, China || TKO || 1 || 1:29
|- 
|-  bgcolor="#CCFFCC"
| 2015-03-28 || Win || align="left" | Posy Kerr || Wu Lin Feng 2015 || Zhumadian, Henan, China || TKO || 2 || 2:00
|- 
|-  bgcolor="#CCFFCC"
| 2015-02-06 || Win || align="left" | Oh Bella || Hero Soul World Championship 2015 || Linyi, Shandong, China || Decision (Unanimous) || 3 || 3:00
|- 
|-  bgcolor="#CCFFCC"
| 2015-01-31 || Win || align="left" | Simon Marcus || Wu Lin Feng World Championship 2015 || Chongqing, China || TKO (referee stoppage) || 2 || 1:05
|- 
|-  bgcolor="#CCFFCC"
| 2014-12-27 || Win || align="left" | Magomedov Lasseur || Wu Lin Feng 2014 || Pingdingshan, Henan, China || Decision (Unanimous) || 3 || 3:00
|- 
|-  bgcolor="#CCFFCC"
| 2014-11-29 || Win || align="left" | Cullens || WKF World Championship 2014 || Xiamen, China || KO (Right Straight) || 1 || 2:50
|- 
! colspan="9" style="background:white" |Wins the WKF World Champion title -80 kg.
|-  bgcolor="#CCFFCC"
| 2014-11-21 || Win || align="left" | Yevgeniy Borowcove || Wu Lin Feng 2014 || Xiaogan, Hubei, China || TKO (Doctor stop) || 2 || 1:20
|- 
|-  bgcolor="#CCFFCC"
| 2014-11-14 || Win || align="left" | Mojtaba Hosseinzabeh || Wu Lin Feng 2014 || Changsha, China || KO (After turning kick) || 2 || 1:00
|- 
|-  bgcolor="#CCFFCC"
| 2014-10-04 || Win || align="left" | Allison Guha || Wu Lin Feng 2014 || Wenling, Zhejiang, China || TKO (Corner stop) || 1 || 0:40
|- 
! colspan="9" style="background:white" |Wins the WLF International Title -80 kg.
|-  bgcolor="#CCFFCC"
| 2014-09-21 || Win || align=left| Yabiku Kazuya || Peng Cheng Jue: China vs Japan || Shenzhen, China || TKO (Referee Stoppage) || 1 || 1:24
|-
|-  bgcolor="#CCFFCC"
| 2014-07-18 || Win || align="left" | Paruiyong || Wu Lin Feng 2014 || Dingyuan, Anhui, China || Decision (Unanimous) || 3 || 3:00
|- 
|-  bgcolor="#CCFFCC"
| 2014-05-24 || Win || align="left" | Carl N'Diaye || Wu Lin Feng & Yokkao 9 || Xinyang, Henan, China || Decision (Unanimous) || 3 || 3:00
|- 
|-  bgcolor="#CCFFCC"
| 2014-01-18 || Win || align="left" | Yuki Kudo || Wu Lin Feng World Championship 2014 || Xiangyang, Hubei, China ||  TKO (Referee Stoppage) || 3 ||
|- 
|-  bgcolor="#CCFFCC"
| 2014-01-11 || Win || align="left" | Oh Bella Pollitt || Hongdu Real estate & Qiancheng group Championship || Dalian, China || Decision (Unanimous) || 3 || 3:00
|- 
! colspan="9" style="background:white" |Wins the IWSD World Champion Title. -80 kg
|-  bgcolor="#CCFFCC"
| 2013-12-31 || Win || align="left" | Khomsan Hanchana || WKC World Championship 2013 || Jilin, China || Ext. R Decision (Unanimous) || 4 || 3:00
|- 
|-  bgcolor="#CCFFCC"
| 2013-12-14 || Win || align="left" | Langlois Olivier || Changsha World Championship 2013 || Changsha, China || Decision (Unanimous) || 3 || 3:00
|- 
|-  bgcolor="#CCFFCC"
| 2013-11-27 || Win || align="left" | Ahbai || Wu Lin Feng 2013 || Anyang, Henan, China || KO (Punches) || 2 || 0:19
|- 
|-  bgcolor="#CCFFCC"
| 2013-09-18 || Win || align="left" | Blood diamond Mike || Wu Lin Feng 2013 || Linquan, Anhui, China || Decision (Unanimous) || 3 || 3:00
|- 
|-  bgcolor="#CCFFCC"
| 2013-08-24 || Win || align="left" | Wisrichai || Wu Lin Feng 2013 || Huaibei, Anhui, China || Decision (Unanimous) || 3 || 3:00
|- 
|-  bgcolor="#CCFFCC"
| 2013-06-06 || Win || align="left" | Alka Matewa || Wu Lin Feng 2013 || Dubai, United Arab Emirates || Decision (Unanimous) || 3 || 3:00
|- 
|-  bgcolor="#CCFFCC"
| 2013-05-06 || Win || align="left" | Ronan Dennis || Wu Lin Feng 2013 || Nanyang, Henan, China || Decision (Unanimous) || 3 || 3:00
|- 
|-  bgcolor="#CCFFCC"
| 2013-03-31 || Win || align="left" | Michael Andre || Wu Lin Feng 2013 || Wenling, Zhejiang, China || KO (Punches) || 1 ||
|- 
|-  bgcolor="#CCFFCC"
| 2013-02-02 || Win || align="left" | Kim Se-Ki || Wu Lin Feng VS THE KHAN || Seoul, Korea || KO (Punches) || 3 ||
|- 
|-  bgcolor="#CCFFCC"
| 2012-12-31 || Win || align="left" | Kaoklai Kaennorsing || Wu Lin Feng 2012 || Beijing, China || Decision (Unanimous) || 3 || 3:00
|- 
|-  bgcolor="#CCFFCC"
| 2012-10-20 || Win || align="left" | Artur Temishev || Wu Lin Feng 2012 || Zhengzhou, China || Decision (Unanimous) || 3 || 3:00
|- 
|-  bgcolor="#CCFFCC"
| 2012-09-25 || Win || align="left" | Gary Williams || 2012 Guangyuan International Tournament || Hefei, China || Decision (Unanimous) || 3 || 3:00
|- 
|-  bgcolor="#CCFFCC"
| 2012-06-23 || Win || align="left" | Samuel Jeanfred || Wu Lin Feng 2012 || Foshan, China || Decision (Unanimous) || 3 || 3:00
|- 
|-  bgcolor="#CCFFCC"
| 2012-04-28 || Win || align="left" | Sammy Masa || 2012 Wu Lin Feng & Day of Destruction 5 || Hamburg, Germany || Decision (Unanimous) || 3 || 3:00
|- 
|-  bgcolor="#CCFFCC"
| 2012-03-31 || Win || align="left" | Kenta Takagi || 2012 Wu Lin Feng China VS Japan || Zhengzhou, China || KO || 3 ||
|- 
|-  bgcolor="#CCFFCC"
| 2012-01-14 || Win || align="left" | Edgar || Wu Lin Feng 2012 || Hebi, Henan, China || Decision (Unanimous) || 3 || 3:00
|- 
|-  bgcolor="#CCFFCC"
| 2011-10-22 || Win || align="left" | Shawn Yarborough || Wu Lin Feng: China vs USA || Las Vegas, USA || Decision (Unanimous) || 3 || 3:00
|- 
|-  bgcolor="#CCFFCC"
| 2011-08-20 || Win || align="left" | Manabu || 2011 Wu Lin Feng China VS Japan and Germany || Zhengzhou, China || KO || 1 ||
|- 
|-  bgcolor="#CCFFCC"
| 2011-06-25 || Win || align="left" | Tom Brennan || 2011 Wu Lin Feng China VS USA || Zhengzhou, China || KO || 1 ||
|- 
|-  bgcolor="#CCFFCC"
| 2011-06-11 || Win || align="left" | Slava Alexichek || 2011 Wu Lin Feng China VS New Zealand || Shangqiu, Henan, China || KO || 3 || 1:20
|- 
|-  bgcolor="#CCFFCC"
| 2011-05-01 || Win || align="left" | Saiseelek.Nor-Seepun || 2011 Wu Lin Feng China VS Thailand || Zhengzhou, China || Decision (Unanimous) || 3 || 3:00
|- 
|-  bgcolor="#CCFFCC"
| 2011-04-02 || Win || align="left" | Sun Tongjian || Wu Lin Feng 2011 || Zhengzhou, China || TKO || 1 ||
|- 
|-  bgcolor="#CCFFCC"
| 2011-03-26 || Win || align="left" | Ma Chuang || Wu Lin Feng 2011 || Zhengzhou, China || TKO || 1 ||
|- 
|-  bgcolor="#CCFFCC"
| 2011-03-19 || Win || align="left" | Wu Zhonghai || Wu Lin Feng 2011 || Zhengzhou, China || Decision (Unanimous) || 3 || 3:00
|- 
|-  bgcolor="#CCFFCC"
| 2011-01-15 || Win || align="left" | Yuki Kudo || Wu Lin Feng 2011 || Hebi, Henan, China || TKO || 3 ||
|- 
|-  bgcolor="#CCFFCC"
| 2011-01-08 || Win || align="left" | Li Baoming || Wu Lin Feng 2011 || Zhengzhou, China || Decision (Unanimous) || 3 || 3:00
|- 
|-  bgcolor="#CCFFCC"
| 2011-01-02 || Win || align="left" | Liu Hongao || Wu Lin Feng 2011 || Zhengzhou, China || Decision (Unanimous) || 3 || 3:00
|- 
|-  bgcolor="#CCFFCC"
| 2009-11-21 || Win || align="left" | Qing Gele || Wu Lin Feng 2009 || Zhengzhou, China || TKO || 2 ||
|- 
|-  bgcolor="#CCFFCC"
| 2009-07-18 || Win || align="left" | Wu Hao || Wu Lin Feng 2009 || Zhengzhou, China || Decision (Unanimous) || 3 || 3:00 
|- 
|-  bgcolor="#CCFFCC"
| 2009-05-24 || Win || align="left" | Luis Carlo Bonali || Wu Lin Feng 2009 || Zhengzhou, China || Decision (Unanimous) || 3 || 3:00 
|- 
|-  bgcolor="#CCFFCC"
| 2009-01-17 || Win || align="left" | Brett Juggernaut Whitton || Wu Lin Feng 2009 || Luoyang, China || Decision (Unanimous) || 3 || 3:00 
|-
|-  bgcolor="#FFBBBB"
| 2008-11-29 || Loss || align="left" | Bian Maofu || 2008 Chinese Wushu Sanda King Tournament || Harbin, China || Decision (Unanimous) || 3 || 3:00 
|-
|-  bgcolor="#CCFFCC"
| 2008-11-14 || Win || align="left" | Aotegen Bateer || 2008 Chinese Wushu Sanda King Tournament || Harbin, China || Decision (Unanimous) || 3 || 3:00 
|-
|-  bgcolor="#CCFFCC"
| 2008-11-02 || Win || align="left" | Zhang Kaiyin || 2008 Chinese Wushu Sanda King Tournament || Harbin, China || Decision (Unanimous) || 3 || 3:00 
|-
|-  bgcolor="#CCFFCC"
| 2008-10-26 || Win || align="left" | Fu Gaofeng || 2008 Chinese Wushu Sanda King Tournament || Harbin, China || Decision (Unanimous) || 3 || 3:00 
|-
|-  bgcolor="#FFBBBB"
| 2007-08-01 || Loss || align="left" | Muslim Salikhov || 2007 China vs Russia Sanshou Tournament || Harbin, China || Decision (Unanimous) || 3 || 3:00 
|- 
|-  bgcolor="#FFBBBB"
| 2007-03-25 || Loss || align="left" | Bai Jinbin || 2007 KFK Wushu International tournament || Chongqing, China || Decision (Unanimous) || 3 || 3:00 
|- 
! style=background:white colspan=9 |KFK Wushu International tournament final -80 kg. 
|-
|-  bgcolor="#CCFFCC"
| 2007-03-23 || Win || align="left" | Chofalo Daniele || 2007 KFK Wushu International tournament || Chongqing, China || Decision (Unanimous) || 3 || 3:00 
|- 
|-
| colspan=9 | Legend:

References 

Chinese male kickboxers
Middleweight kickboxers
Welterweight kickboxers
1982 births
Living people
Chinese sanshou practitioners
Chinese wushu practitioners
People from Bengbu
Sportspeople from Anhui